Desh Bhagat Institute of Engineering and Management (DBIEM) is an institution of higher education near Moga, Punjab, northern India, and about 70km from Ludhiana. The institute provides courses leading to a number of engineering and management qualifications and is affiliated with the All India Council for Technical Education and the Punjab Technical University.

Universities and colleges in Punjab, India
Engineering colleges in Punjab, India
All India Council for Technical Education
Business schools in Punjab, India
2009 establishments in Punjab, India
Educational institutions established in 2009